Faculty of Engineering, Çanakkale Onsekiz Mart University, (ÇOMÜ) is a higher educational institution in Çanakkale Province, Turkey.

History
The Faculty was established in 1995 as the Faculty of Engineering and Architecture. It moved to the main campus in 2001 from the town centre.

In 2012, the faculty was divided by the Turkish Cabinet into two different faculties: Faculty of Engineering and Faculty of Architecture and Design.

The Faculty actively continues undergraduate and postgraduate education.

Departments 
 Department of Computer Engineering
 Department of Food Engineering
 Department of Geological Engineering
 Department of Geophysical Engineering
 Department of Environmental Engineering
 Department of Civil Engineering
 Department of Industrial Engineering
 Department of Geomatics
 Department of Chemical Engineering
 Department of Mining Engineering
 Department of Material Science
 Department of Bioengineering

Laboratories 
Staff and graduate students can benefit from the laboratories for General Geology, Mineralogy and Petrography, Mineral Deposits, Engineering Geology, and Soil and Rock Mechanics, and a museum for natural stones and fossils. The university also has a central laboratories building.

Staff 
The faculty has an academic and administrative staff of over 80 members, 1,000 undergraduate students studying in departments and has graduated over 1,000 students since 1999.

References

External links
 Official site

Engineering
Engineering universities and colleges in Turkey
Educational institutions established in 1995
1995 establishments in Turkey